Mikael Torpegaard (born 8 May 1994) is a Danish professional tennis player, who as of April 2022 is the second highest ranked male tennis player from Denmark behind Holger Rune. Mikael Torpegaard is a member of the Denmark Davis Cup team.

Earlier career
Torpegaard won his first career ATP Challenger $75,000 title at the 2016 Columbus Challenger, which is played at Ohio State, where Mikael went to college and became a five-time All-American and a two-time Big Ten Athlete of the Year, an achievement that ranks him among the most successful tennis players in Ohio State history.

Professional career

2019: ATP debut
Torpegaard qualified for his first ATP main draw at the 2019 Citi Open in Washington, USA where he lost to Marius Copil.

2021: Grand Slam debut
Torpegaard made his Grand Slam main draw debut at the 2021 Australian Open as a lucky loser where he lost to Lloyd Harris.

Davis Cup
On 22 September 2015 Torpegaard, representing host Denmark for the third time in Davis Cup play, played Rafael Nadal, losing 6–4, 6–3, 6–2.

Challenger and Futures finals

Singles: 9 (5–4)

Doubles: 8 (6–2)

Davis Cup matches

See also
List of Denmark Davis Cup team representatives

References

External links
 
 
 

Living people
1994 births
Danish male tennis players
Ohio State Buckeyes men's tennis players
People from Gentofte Municipality
Sportspeople from the Capital Region of Denmark
21st-century Danish people